CISH may refer to:
 Chromogenic in situ hybridization, a technique in molecular biology
 CISH (gene), coding for the cytokine-inducible SH2-containing protein
 International Committee of Historical Sciences, also referred to as Comité International des Sciences Historiques (CISH) outside the anglosphere